Eucalyptus cypellocarpa, commonly known as mountain grey gum, mountain gum, monkey gum or spotted mountain grey gum, is a species of straight, smooth-barked forest tree that is endemic to southeastern Australia. It has relatively large, lance-shaped to curved adult leaves, flower buds in groups of seven, white flowers and usually cylindrical or barrel-shaped fruit.

Description
It has smooth white, grey or yellowish bark that is shed in long ribbons. Flowering occurs from January to June and from October to November and the flowers are white. The valves of the fruit are usually below rim level.

Taxonomy
Eucalyptus cypellocarpa was first formally described in 1962 by the Australian botanist Lawrie Johnson who collected the type specimen at "Sawmill to Wynne's Rocks, Mt. Wilson, 3,100 feet". The specific epithet (cypellocarpa) means "cup-fruit".

Distribution and habitat
Mountain gum is found in New South Wales and Victoria where it tends to grow in wet sclerophyll forest, in gullies and on mid-altitude hillsides, from 30.25 to 39 degrees south. In New South Wales it is widespread in wet forests south from Tamworth, and in Victoria it is widespread in the south-east, including in the Black Range, Grampians and Pyrenees.

References

Eucalyptus cypellocarpa http://morwellnp.pangaean.net/cgi-bin/show_species.cgi?find_this=Eucalyptus%20cypellocarpa

cypellocarpa
Myrtales of Australia
Trees of Australia
Flora of New South Wales
Flora of the Australian Capital Territory
Flora of Victoria (Australia)
Trees of mild maritime climate
Plants described in 1962
Taxa named by Lawrence Alexander Sidney Johnson